Yves Rogers (born 1989) is a former Dutch professional basketball player who played for Dutch league eredivisie club Upstairs! Weert from 2009 till 2012 season.

References

Dutch men's basketball players
BSW (basketball club) players
1989 births
Living people
Place of birth missing (living people)
Date of birth missing (living people)
21st-century Dutch people